is a vertically scrolling shoot 'em up arcade game released by Nichibutsu in 1988. The player controls a spacecraft called the Vowger and shoots enemies, collects power-ups and attempts to defeat bosses to advance levels. The Vowger can be changed to shoot in a multitude of formations and directions.

Story

Taking place in the future of the space pioneering era, a mysterious point in the galaxy known as Point X1Y7Z94 is accidentally discovered, suddenly opens up and engulfs the stations nearby. All radio transmissions are silenced by the unknown, but violent forces on the other side as the point shows the energy capable of opening a black hole. The Milky Way Federation sends the latest developed star fighter in their fleet, the Vowger RC30, to Point X1Y7Z94 to investigate the area and eliminate the forces responsible for the events.

Ports 
Formation Armed F was released as "Armed F" on the Nintendo Switch in the Nintendo eShop on 28 March 2019 by Hamster Corporation as part of their Arcade Archives series.

References

External links

1988 video games
Arcade video games
Nihon Bussan games
Nintendo Switch games
PlayStation 4 games
TurboGrafx-16 games
Vertically scrolling shooters
Video games developed in Japan
Cooperative video games
Science fiction video games
Hamster Corporation games
Multiplayer and single-player video games